Freedom Force vs the 3rd Reich is a fictional real-time tactical role-playing game developed and published by Irrational Games. The sequel to Freedom Force, the player guides a team of superheroes as they travel back in time, and help overthrow Nazi Germany and its allies during World War II. In the game, players take control of a team of up to four characters and battle their way through completely destructible 3D maps in a series of missions based on classic superhero comics.

Plot
Supervillain Nuclear Winter steals Time Master's inert body and uses it to steal nuclear missiles from the Cuban Missile Crisis in an effort to start a nuclear war between the United States and the USSR. The Freedom Force foils his plot, but on the return trip, the timeline changes and Freedom Force finds that the Axis powers achieved victory in World War II. Using the disturbance in the timeline to guide them, Mentor projects the heroes back in the time-stream to battle the villainous Blitzkrieg, who created the disturbance. These superheroes meet and team up with the heroes of that age. In the course of Blitzkrieg's defeat, Alchemiss gains powers from Time Master's body and frees Man-Bot from the Celestial Clock, but goes insane over the sudden expansion of her powers and becomes Entropy, who threatens time and space. Entropy is eventually defeated by Freedom Force with the help of the awakened Time Master. Briefly asserting her original personality, Alchemiss prevents herself from ever existing so she cannot become Entropy, but suddenly finds herself face to face with Energy X.

Reception

The game received "generally favorable reviews", albeit slightly less than the original Freedom Forces "universal acclaim", according to the review aggregation website Metacritic.

Freedom Force vs the 3rd Reich was a runner-up for Computer Games Magazines list of the top 10 computer games of 2005.

Legacy and modifications (mods) 
Freedom Force vs the Third Reich followed its predecessor title, Freedom Force, by providing a game engine that could play campaigns (adventures consisting of multiple missions) other than the one released with the game. The developers released a suite of mod tools to allow fans to design their own campaigns and add their own art assets for use in the game. This approach, using a format that was highly modifiable and open to third-party editing, has attracted a strong online community of modding enthusiasts, centered around a discussion board called Freedom Reborn, where modders have taken to creating their own content for the game. Subject matter for fan-created game mods ranges from new original characters and stories to characters from other franchises.

The game's modding community has created a wide variety of content, including new art assets like textures (called skins), 3D models (called meshes), visual effects (FX) and maps. Contributors have also created voice packs, new Rumble Room (a combat sandbox) missions and dozens of entire campaigns. Custom content is often hosted at independent creator sites and many popular mods from the last few years can be found at ModDB. One such modification resulted in the unofficial expansion pack, called Freedom Force X, or FFX, originally created for the Freedom Force and later expanded for Freedom Force vs the Third Reich. FFX adds artistic content and scripting to enable dozens of new powers, attributes and customization options for game characters.

Notes

References

External links
 

2005 video games
2K games
Electronic Arts games
Gamebryo games
Irrational Games
Multiplayer and single-player video games
Python (programming language)-scripted video games
Real-time tactics video games
Superhero video games
Tactical role-playing video games
Video game sequels
Windows games
Windows-only games
World War II video games
Video games scored by Eric Brosius
Video games set in the United States
Video games about Nazi Germany
Video game mods
Video games developed in the United States
Digital Jesters games